Sigma Orionis or Sigma Ori (σ Orionis, σ Ori) is a multiple star system in the constellation Orion, consisting of the brightest members of a young open cluster.  It is found at the eastern end of the belt, south west of Alnitak and west of the Horsehead Nebula which it partially illuminates.  The combined brightness of the component stars is magnitude 3.80.

History

σ Orionis is a naked eye star at the eastern end of Orion's Belt, and has been known since antiquity, but it was not included in Ptolemy's Almagest.  It was referred to by Al Sufi, but not formally listed in his catalogue.  In more modern times, it was measured by Tycho Brahe and included in his catalogue.  In Kepler's extension it is described as "Quae ultimam baltei praecedit ad austr." (preceding the outermost of the belt, to the south).  It was then recorded by Johann Bayer in his Uranometria as a single star with the Greek letter σ (sigma).  He described it as "in enſe, prima" (in the sword, first).  It was also given the Flamsteed designation 48.

In 1776, Christian Mayer described σ Ori as a triple star, having seen components AB and E, and suspected another between the two.  Component D was confirmed by FGW Struve who also added a fourth (C), published in 1876.  In 1892 Sherburne Wesley Burnham reported that σ Ori A was itself a very close double, although a number of later observers failed to confirm it.  In the second half of the twentieth century, the orbit of σ Ori A/B was solved and at the time was one of the most massive binaries known.

σ Ori A was discovered to have a variable radial velocity in 1904, considered to indicate a single-lined spectroscopic binary.  The spectral lines of the secondary were elusive and often not seen at all, possibly because they are broadened by rapid rotation.  There was confusion over whether the reported spectroscopic binary status actually referred to the known visual companion B.  Finally in 2011, it was confirmed that the system is triple, with an inner spectroscopic pair and a wider visual companion.  The inner pair was resolved interferometrically in 2013.

σ Ori E was identified as helium-rich in 1956, having variable radial velocity in 1959, having variable emission features in 1974, having an abnormally strong magnetic field in 1978, being photometrically variable in 1977, and formally classified as a variable star in 1979.

In 1996, a large number of low-mass pre-main sequence stars were identified in the region of Orion's Belt.  A particular close grouping was discovered to lie around σ Orionis.  A large number of brown dwarfs were found in the same area and at the same distance as the bright σ Orionis stars.  Optical, infrared, and x-ray objects in the cluster, including 115 non-members lying in the same direction, were listed in the Mayrit Catalogue with a running number, except for the central star which was listed simply as Mayrit AB.

Cluster

The σ Orionis cluster is part of the Ori OB1b stellar association, commonly referred to as Orion's Belt.  The cluster was not recognised until 1996 when a population of pre-main sequence stars was discovered around σ Ori.  Since then it has been extensively studied because of its closeness and the lack of interstellar extinction.  It has been calculated that star formation in the cluster began 3 million years (myr) ago and it is approximately 360 pc away.

In the central arc-minute of the cluster five particularly bright stars are visible, labelled A to E in order of distance from the brightest component σ Ori A.  The closest pair AB are only separated by 0.2" - 0.3" but were discovered with a 12" telescope.  An infrared and radio source, IRS1, 3.3" from σ Ori A that was considered to be a patch of nebulosity has been resolved into two subsolar stars.  There is an associated variable x-ray source that is assumed to be a T Tauri star.

The cluster is considered to include a number of other stars of spectral class A or B:
 HD 37699, an outlying B5 giant very close to the Horsehead Nebula
 HD 37525, a B5 main sequence star and spectroscopic binary
 HD 294271, a B5 young stellar object with two low mass companions
 HD 294272, a binary containing two B class young stellar objects
 HD 37333, a peculiar A1 main sequence star
 HD 37564, an A8 young stellar object
 V1147 Ori, a B9.5 giant and α2 CVn variable
 HD 37686, a B9.5 main sequence star close to HD 37699
 HD 37545, an outlying B9 main sequence
 HD 294273, an A8 young stellar object
 2MASS J05374178-0229081, an A9 young stellar object

HD 294271 and HD 294272 make up the "double" star Struve 761 (or STF 761).  It is three arc minutes from σ Orionis, which is also known as Struve 762.

Over 30 other probable cluster members have been detected within an arc minute of the central star, mostly brown dwarfs and planetary mass objects such as S Ori 70, but including the early M red dwarfs 2MASS J05384746-0235252 and 2MASS J05384301-0236145.  In total, several hundred low mass objects are thought to be cluster members, including around a hundred spectroscopically measured class M stars, around 40 K class stars, and a handful of G and F class objects.  Many are grouped in a central core, but there is a halo of associated objects scattered across more than 10 arc-minutes.

σ Orionis AB
The brightest member of the σ Orionis system appears as a late O class star, but is actually made up of three stars, designated Aa, Ab, and B.  The inner pair complete a highly eccentric orbit every 143 days, while the outer star completes its near-circular orbit once every 157 years. It has not yet completed a full orbit since it was first discovered to be a double star.

Components

Their separation varies from less than half an astronomical unit to around two AU. Although they cannot be directly imaged with conventional single mirror telescopes, their respective visual magnitudes have been calculated at 4.61 and 5.20. The two components of σ Orionis A have been resolved interferometrically using the CHARA array, and the combination of interferometric and visual observations yields a very accurate orbit.

The spectrum of component B, the outer star of the triple, cannot be detected. The luminosity contribution from σ Ori B can be measured and it is likely to be a B0-2 main sequence star. Its visual magnitude of 5.31 is similar to σ Ori Ab and so it should be easily visible, but it is speculated that its spectral lines are highly broadened and invisible against the backdrop of the other two stars. The orbit of component B has been calculated precisely using the NPOI and CHARA arrays. The combined orbits of the three stars together give a parallax significantly more precise than the HIPPARCOS parallax.

The inclinations of the two orbits are known accurately enough to calculate their relative inclination. The two orbital planes are within 30° of being orthogonal, with the inner orbit being prograde and the outer retrograde. Although slightly surprising, this situation is not necessarily rare in triple systems.

Mass discrepancy
The masses of these three component stars can be calculated using: spectroscopic calculation of the surface gravity and hence a spectroscopic mass; comparison of evolutionary models to the observed physical properties to determine an evolutionary mass as well as the age of the stars; or determination of a dynamical mass from the orbital motions of the stars. However, the dynamical masses are all larger than the evolutionary masses by more than their margins of error, indicating a systemic problem. This type of mass discrepancy is a common and long-standing problem found in many stars.

Ages
Comparison of the observed or calculated physical properties of each star with theoretical stellar evolutionary tracks allows the age of the star to be estimated. The estimated ages of the components Aa, Ab, and B, are respectively  Myr,  Myr, and  Myr. Within their large margins of error, these can all be considered to be consistent with each other, although it is harder to reconcile them with the 2-3 Myr estimated age of the σ Orionis cluster as a whole.

σ Orionis C
The faintest member of the main σ Orionis stars is component C.  It is also the closest to σ Ori AB at 11", corresponding to 3,960 astronomical units.  It is an A-type main sequence star.  σ Ori C has a faint companion 2" away, referred to as Cb and MAD-4.  Cb is five magnitudes fainter than σ Ori Ca at infrared wavelengths, K band magnitude 14.07, and is likely to be a brown dwarf.

σ Orionis D
Component D is a fairly typical B2 main sequence star of magnitude 6.62.  It is 13" from σ Ori AB, corresponding to 4,680 AU.  Its size, temperature, and brightness are very similar to σ Ori E but it shows none of the unusual spectral features or variability of that star.

σ Orionis E

Component E is an unusual variable star, classified as an SX Arietis variable and also known as V1030 Orionis.  It is helium-rich, has a strong magnetic field, and varies between magnitudes 6.61 and 6.77 during a 1.19 day period of rotation.  It has a spectral type of B2 Vpe.  The variability is believed to be due to large-scale variations in surface brightness caused by the magnetic field.  The rotational period is slowing due to magnetic braking; it is one of the few magnetic stars to have its rotation period change directly measured. σ Ori E is 41" from σ Ori AB, approximately 15,000 AU.

The magnetic field is highly variable from −2,300 to +3,100 gauss, matching the brightness variations and the likely rotational period.  This requires a magnetic dipole of at least 10,000 G.  Around minimum brightness, a shell type spectrum appears, attributed to plasma clouds rotating above the photosphere.  The helium enhancement in the spectrum may be due to hydrogen being preferentially trapped towards the magnetic poles leaving excess helium near the equator.  It was at one point suggested that σ Ori E could be further away and older than the other members of the cluster, from modelling its evolutionary age and size. However, Gaia parallaxes place σ Ori E within the cluster, and later modelling has suggested that it is very young, at less than a million years old.

σ Ori E has a faint companion about a third of an arc-second away.  It is about 5 magnitudes fainter than the helium-rich primary, about magnitude 10-11 at K band infrared wavelengths.  It is presumed to be a low mass star .

σ Orionis IRS1
The infrared source IRS1 is close to σ Ori A.  It has been resolved to a pair of low mass objects, a proplyd, and a possible third object. The fainter object is very unusual, showing a diluted M7 or M8 absorption spectrum with emission lines of hydrogen and helium. The interpretation is that it is a brown dwarf embedded within a proplyd that is being photoevaporated by σ Ori A.  X-ray emission from IRS1 suggests the presence of an accretion disc around a T Tauri star, but it is unclear how this can fit with the proplyd scenario.

Dust wave

In infrared images, a prominent arc is visible centred on σ Ori AB.  It is about 50" away from the class O star, around 0.1 parsecs at its distance.  It is directed towards IC434, the Horesehead Nebula, in line with the space motion of the star.  The appearance is similar to a bowshock, but the type of radiation shows that it is not a bowshock.  The observed infrared emission, peaking at around 45 microns, can be modelled by two approximately black-body components, one at 68K and one at 197 K.  These are thought to be produced by two different sizes of dust grains.

The material of the arc is theorised to be produced by photoevaporation from the molecular cloud around the Horsehead Nebula.  The dust becomes decoupled from the gas that carried it away from the molecular cloud by radiation pressure from the hot stars at the centre of the σ Orionis cluster.  The dust accumulates into a denser region that is heated and forms the visible infrared shape.

The term "dust wave" is applied when the dust piles up but the gas is largely unaffected, as opposed to a "bow wave" where both dust and gas are stopped.  Dust waves occur when the interstellar medium is sufficiently dense and the stellar wind sufficiently weak that the dust stand-off distance is larger than the stand-off distance of a bow shock.  This would clearly be more likely for slow-moving stars, but slow-moving luminous stars may not have lifetimes long enough to produce a bow wave.  Low luminosity late class O stars should commonly produce bow waves if this model is correct.

Distance
The distance to σ Orionis and the cluster of stars around it has historically been uncertain. Hipparcos parallaxes were available for several presumed members, but with very high uncertainties for the σ Orionis components.

Gaia has published parallaxes for hundreds of cluster members, including brown dwarfs, and thousands of other stars in the field of the cluster. These have low statistical uncertainties although significant astrometric excess noise. No Gaia parallax has been published for the central AB component.

References

External links
 Turn Left at Orion Naked eye and telescopic views
 σ Orionis  Researchers page at Instituto de Astrofísica de Andalucía
 January double star Observing guide from Astronomical Society of Southern Africa
 Bright and Multiple Stars Gallery taken at Fresno State's Campus Observatory, largely by students
 A Quintuple Star in the Constellation Orion for simpler explanation and pictures

Orion (constellation)
Orion molecular cloud complex
5
O-type main-sequence stars
B-type main-sequence stars
A-type main-sequence stars
Orionis, Sigma
Orionis, 48
1931
026549
037468
Durchmusterung objects
SX Arietis variables
Orionis, V1030
Open clusters
Emission-line stars
J05384476-0236001